Mohamed Bouchara (born 1944) is a Moroccan boxer. He competed in the men's welterweight event at the 1968 Summer Olympics.

References

1944 births
Living people
Moroccan male boxers
Olympic boxers of Morocco
Boxers at the 1968 Summer Olympics
Sportspeople from Casablanca
Welterweight boxers